Portillo's Restaurant Group, Inc. is an American fast casual restaurant chain based in the Chicago area that specializes in serving Chicago-style food such as hot dogs, Maxwell Street Polish, and Italian beef. The company was founded by Dick Portillo on April 9, 1963, in Villa Park, Illinois under the name "The Dog House".

Outside of Chicago metropolitan area and Northern Illinois, the chain also has four locations each in central Illinois, the Indianapolis metropolitan area, and the Phoenix metropolitan area; three locations in the Minneapolis-St. Paul metropolitan area and Tampa metropolitan area; two locations each in the Milwaukee metropolitan area, Madison metropolitan area, Orlando, and Southern California; and one location each in Metro Detroit, South Bend metropolitan area, Fort Wayne, Dallas–Fort Worth metroplex, and the Quad Cities.

History
Portillo's was founded in 1963 by Dick Portillo.  After returning from serving in the Marines, Portillo gathered money from his savings and from an investment from his brother Frank to open a hot dog stand.  They bought a 12-foot trailer that had no restroom and no running water.  They named it "The Dog House".  The Dog House operated on North Avenue in Villa Park.  At the beginning stages, the stand was losing money and Portillo needed to find a solution.  Portillo went to do some research one day on how other competitors were operating and snuck into one of the back rooms of a competitor and wrote down where they were purchasing their product.  He continued the process of learning by visiting different competitors.  By 1967, The Dog House was in good standing, was upgraded to a larger trailer, and was renamed "Portillo's".  In 1970, he partnered with Harold Reskin and opened up his second location in a shopping mall that Reskin owned.  Between 1972 and 1989, he opened up a second restaurant under the name "Barney's" that specialized in BBQ meals. In 1983 Portillo's opened up its first drive thru in Downers Grove.  In the 90's Portillo's had profited by more than $50 million with 25 stores around the Chicago area.  In 1993, he experimented with a few ideas by combining his concept stores Barney's and Barnelli's with a Portillo's restaurant. In 1994, the first Portillo's within Chicago city limits opened at the intersection of Clark and Ontario St.  In 1995, Portillo opened Key Wester Fish & Pasta House in Naples, Florida.  In 1996, Portillo brought the Key Wester Fish & Pasta to Naperville. In 2000, Portillo opened another concept restaurant called Luigi's House. The Portillo's chain grew again in 2010 with Honey-Jam Café. The Batavia, Illinois location closed just three years later.

In 2014, Portillo sold Portillo's to Berkshire Partners. The new owners are planning to open five to seven restaurants each year. Portillo has been buying the land for new sites, which he then leases back to the company.

The company filed to go public in 2021. Its initial public offering sold 28% of the company as stocks traded on the Nasdaq as of October 21, 2021, with private equity firm Berkshire Partners retaining the remainder of the ownership.

Outside Illinois
Portillo's had licensed restaurants in Tokyo, Japan, in the late 1980s and early '90s. The Japanese locations all eventually closed.

Portillo's first California location opened on October 11, 2005, at the Buena Park Downtown shopping center in Buena Park. The second California location opened in 2008 in Moreno Valley. 

Portillo's opened its first Florida location in 2016 in the Tampa suburb of Brandon, Florida and a second location that same year in the University Square neighborhood in Tampa. The chain generated publicity with a tongue-in-cheek open letter on its website on June 16, 2015, the day after its hometown NHL team, the Chicago Blackhawks, beat the Tampa Bay Lightning to win the 2015 Stanley Cup. The stunt received newspaper coverage in both cities. "It's official. Portillo's is coming to Tampa in 2016. Tampa residents spent years peppering us with requests to build a restaurant — you really put us in a pickle. So we're thrilled we're finally making our way to Florida," Portillo's letter said, showing the chain's ironic humor. "Let's be frank: No matter whose jersey you're wearing, everyone will be welcome. We hope you don't have a beef against us or our hometown team." Both Tampa and Brandon, FL locations are themed 30's Prohibition. 

The Minneapolis-St. Paul region's first location opened in Woodbury in mid-summer 2017. Shortly thereafter in early fall 2017, the chain's first restaurant in the Indianapolis Metropolitan Area commenced operations in Fishers. Many former Chicagoans have moved to both regions. In 2018, Portillo's opened its second and third restaurants in the Minneapolis-St. Paul area (Maple Grove and Roseville, Minnesota) as well as its third and fourth Indiana locations (Mishawaka and Indianapolis) in 2018.

Portillo's opened its first restaurant in the Madison, Wisconsin, area and in the Davenport, Iowa/Quad Cities area (the first location in Iowa) in early 2019.

Portillo's added a new location in Sterling Heights, Michigan, in Metro Detroit which will be the first location within Michigan. It opened in March 2021.

Portillo's announced a new location in the Orlando, Florida, area, located at the corner of Palm Parkway and Daryl Carter Boulevard in Lake Buena Vista. It opened in June 2021.

In December 2021, Portillo's submitted plans to build a new restaurant at Santan Village in Gilbert, Arizona.

In April 2022, Portillo's opened their fourth location in Florida. It is located in St. Petersburg, featuring a 50s theme, and is their third in the Tampa metropolitan area. A location in West Kissimmee was announced the same month and is their second in the Orlando area, and fifth overall in Florida.

In January 2023, Portillo's opened its first location in Texas. It is located in the Dallas Fort Worth Metroplex suburb of The Colony, at the intersection of Highway 121 and Destination Drive at the Grandscape complex.

In February 2023, Portillo's opened the fifth location in Arizona. It is located in Tucson.

Honey Jam Cafe
In 2010, Portillo Restaurant Group launched the Honey Jam Café concept, an upscale pancake house similar to Walker Brothers Pancake House in both ambiance and menu as a breakfast and lunch cafe.

References

External links

Official website

Companies based in DuPage County, Illinois
Companies listed on the Nasdaq
Fast casual restaurants
Fast-food chains of the United States
Hot dog restaurants in the United States
Oak Brook, Illinois
Regional restaurant chains in the United States
Restaurants established in 1963
1963 establishments in Illinois
2021 initial public offerings
Restaurants in California
Restaurants in Chicago
Restaurants in Indiana
Restaurants in Florida